The 2009–10 KNVB Cup was the 92nd season of the Dutch national football knockout tournament. The competition began on 29 August 2009 with the matches of Round 1 and culminated with a double-leg Final on 25 April and 6 May 2010 respectively. Ajax won the final with a 6–1 on aggregate, winning their record 18th title.

The winners of the competition will qualify for the play-off round of the 2010–11 UEFA Europa League.

The final would be played initially on 25 April 2010 at 14.00 in De Kuip at Rotterdam. On 15 April, however, the Royal Dutch Football Association (KNVB) announced that the final will be played over two matches due to imminent supporter violence. The first leg of the final was played in Amsterdam on the original date, with Ajax defeating Feyenoord 2–0, in the rivalry known as Klassieker. The return followed on 6 May in Rotterdam, with Ajax winning 4–1 and 6–1 on aggregate.

Round 1
Round 1 featured 48 amateur teams. 24 of the Hoofdklasse clubs qualified for the competition through their league performance during the previous season, while the other half of the teams competing in the First Round secured their place through the 2008–09 KNVB District Cups.

The draw for this round was conducted on 7 July 2009. The matches were played on 29 August 2009.

|}

Round 2
The clubs from both the Eredivisie 2009-10 and the Eerste Divisie 2009-10 entered in this round, as well as two youth teams. They joined the 24 winners from Round 1.

Participants:

The draw for this round was conducted on 7 July 2009. The matches were played between 22–24 September 2009.

|}

Round 3
Round 3 featured the 32 winning teams from round 2. The draw was on 24 September 2009. The matches were played on October 27–29, 2009.

Participants:

|}

Round 4
Round 4 featured the 16 winning teams from round 3. The draw was on 29 October 2009. The matches were played on 21–23 December 2009, with the postponed match between SC Heerenveen and PSV being played on 16 January 2010.

Qualified participants:

|}

Quarter finals
The quarter finals featured the 8 winning teams from round 4. The draw was on 23 December 2009. The matches were played on 27–28 January 2010.

Qualified participants:

|}

Semi-finals

The semi-finals featured the 4 winning teams from the quarter-finals. The draw was on 27 January 2010. The matches were played on 24 March and 25 March 2010

Qualified participants:

Final

The final would originally have been played as a single match on 25 April 2010 at De Kuip, Rotterdam. However, on 15 April the Dutch FA announced that the final was going to be played over two matches, because Ajax supporters were not allowed to visit matches in De Kuip since 2009. The first leg was played at Amsterdam as scheduled before, and the return leg was competed on 6 May at Rotterdam. This was the first two-leg final since the 1982–83 KNVB Cup Final.

References

External links
 Official site 

2009-10
2009–10 domestic association football cups
2009–10 in Dutch football